Tampering in the context of a controlled process is adjusting the process on the basis of outcomes which are within the expected range of variability. The net result is to re-align the process so that an increased proportion of the output is out of specification. The term was introduced in this context by W. Edwards Deming, and he was a strong proponent of using control charts to avoid tampering.

See also
 Incentive program
 Control chart

References
W. Edwards Deming (1994) The New Economics for Industry, Government, Education, 2nd edition, Massachusetts Inst Technology.   (Chapter 9.)
Deming, W. Edward (1986), Out of the Crisis,  MIT Center for Advanced Engineering Study, 327–32.
Gitlow, Howard; Gitlow, Shelly; Oppenheim, Alan; Oppenheim, Rosa (1989), Tools and Methods for The Improvement of Quality, CRC Press 
Krehbiel, T. C. (1994), "Tampering with a Stable Process". Teaching Statistics, 16, 75–79. 

Quality control